Clearwater Lake is a lake in Cook County, Minnesota, in the United States.

Clearwater Lake is an English translation of the Ojibwe-language name.

See also
List of lakes in Minnesota

References

Lakes of Minnesota
Lakes of Cook County, Minnesota